Being in the World is a 2010 documentary film directed by Tao Ruspoli. The film is based on Martin Heidegger's philosophy and is inspired by Hubert Dreyfus. It features a number of prominent philosophers.

Philosophers such as Hubert Dreyfus, Mark Wrathall, Sean Dorrance Kelly, Taylor Carman, John Haugeland, Iain Thomson, Charles Taylor and Albert Borgmann are featured in the film. 
Other people featured in the film include Ryan Cross, Leah Chase, Manuel Molina, Hiroshi Sakaguchi, Jumane Smith, Austin Peralta, Bob Teague, Lindsey Banner, and Elizabeth Gilbert.

See also
Being and Time
 Critique of technology
 Dasein
 Existence
Phenomenology

References

External links
 

2010 films
2010 documentary films
American documentary films
Films about philosophy
Documentary films about philosophy
Phenomenology
Philosophy of life
Daseinsanalysis
Works about Martin Heidegger
2010s English-language films
2010s American films